Pawan Gill is a film producer and filmmaker born and raised in Vancouver, Canada now based in Mumbai, India. He has his ancestral roots hailing from Ludhiana, Punjab.   He is known for producing films like Shadaa, Puaada, Super Singh and Honsla Rakh.

Career
He moved to India in 2005 to pursue a career as a filmmaker after studying filmmaking at Vancouver Film School, he started work as an assistant director with Yashraj Films where he worked for five years on such films like Neal N Nikki and Dhoom 2. Thereafter he branched out on his own as a director with the film Jo Hum Chahein and then went on to produce Mundeyan Ton Bachke Rahin.  He and filmmaker Anurag Singh (director) set up their company Brat Films where he has produced Super Singh, Shadaa and Puaada.  He co-produced the blockbuster Honsla Rakh with actor Diljit Dosanjh, this is his third film as a producer with the Punjabi actor, their film Shadaa set new box office records in Punjabi cinema. His company's first Hindi language feature film Jersey (2022 film) starring Bollywood superstar Shahid Kapoor produced by his brother Aman Gill released on April 22, 2022.

Personal life
He has a twin brother Aman Gill, who also works in the film industry, he started his career as an executive producer on the film Black. He has produced several Bollywood films including Jersey (2021 film) and Udta Punjab starring Shahid Kapoor amongst many others.

Filmography

Awards

References

External links
 
 

Living people
Indian film producers
Film directors from Mumbai
Film directors from Vancouver
Film producers from Mumbai
Canadian people of Indian descent
People from Punjab, India
People from Ludhiana district
21st-century Indian film directors
Year of birth missing (living people)
Canadian expatriates in India